The Leptotyphlopidae (commonly called slender blind snakes or thread snakes) are a family of snakes found in North America, South America, Africa and Asia. All are fossorial and adapted to burrowing, feeding on ants and termites. Two subfamilies are recognized.

Description

Relatively small snakes, leptotyphlopids rarely exceed  in length; only Trilepida macrolepis and Leptotyphlops occidentalis grow larger. The cranium and upper jaws are immobile and no teeth are in the upper jaw. The lower jaw consists of a much elongated quadrate bone, a tiny compound bone, and a relatively larger dentary bone. The body is cylindrical with a blunt head and a short tail. The scales are highly polished. The pheromones they produce protect them from attack by termites. Among these snakes is what is believed to be the world's smallest: L. carlae (Hedges, 2008).

Geographic range
Leptotyphlopids are found in Africa, western Asia from Turkey to eastern India, on Socotra Island, and from the southwestern United States south through Mexico and Central America to South America, though not in the high Andes. In Pacific South America, they occur as far south as southern coastal Peru, and on the Atlantic side as far as Uruguay and Argentina. In the Caribbean, they are found on the Bahamas, Hispaniola, and the Lesser Antilles.

Habitat
Leptotyphlopids occur in a wide variety of habitats from arid areas to rainforest, and are known to occur near ant and termite nests.

Feeding
The diets of leptotyphlopids consist mostly of termite or ant larvae, pupae, and adults. Most species suck out the contents of insect bodies and discard the exoskeleton.

Reproduction
Snakes in the family Leptotyphlopidae are oviparous.

Taxonomy

 Subfamily Leptotyphlopinae
 Genus Epacrophis Hedges, Adalsteinsson & Branch, 2009 (3 species)
 Genus Leptotyphlops Fitzinger, 1843 (21 species)
 Genus Myriopholis Hedges, Adalsteinsson & Branch, 2009 (23 species)
 Genus Namibiana Hedges, Adalsteinsson & Branch, 2009 (5 species)
 Subfamily Epictinae
 Tribe Epictini, New World snakes 
 Subtribe Epictina
 Genus Epictia Gray, 1845 (44 species)
 Genus Habrophallos Martins, Koch, Pinto, Folly, Fouquet & Passos, 2020 (monotypic, collared blind snake)
 Genus Siagonodon W. Peters, 1881 (4 species)
 Subtribe Renina
 Genus Rena Baird & Girard, 1853 (10 species)
 Genus Trilepida Hedges, 2011 (14 species)
 Subtribe Tetracheilostomina
 Genus Mitophis Hedges, Adalsteinsson & Branch, 2009 (4 species)
 Genus Tetracheilostoma Jan, 1861 (3 species)
 Tribe Rhinoleptini, African snakes
 Genus Tricheilostoma Jan, 1860 (5 species)
 Genus Rhinoleptus Orejas-Miranda, Roux-Estève & Guibé, 1970 (monotypic, Villiers's blind snake)
 Genus Rhinoguinea J.-F. Trape, 2014 (monotypic, Rhinoguinea magna)

Gallery

See also

 List of leptotyphlopid species and subspecies

References

External links
 
iNaturalist page

 
Snake families
Taxa named by Leonhard Stejneger